Dennis Purperhart (born June 10, 1969 in Paramaribo) is a Surinamese professional footballer who last played as midfielder for Amsterdamsche FC.

External links
 

Living people
1969 births
Surinamese footballers
Surinamese expatriate footballers
Suriname international footballers
Sportspeople from Paramaribo
Eredivisie players
Eerste Divisie players
HFC Haarlem players
RKC Waalwijk players
Heracles Almelo players
TOP Oss players
S.V. Robinhood players
SVB Eerste Divisie players
Expatriate footballers in the Netherlands
Surinamese expatriate sportspeople in the Netherlands
Association football midfielders